Women of Sand and Myrrh is a novel written by Hanan al-Shaykh.  It was originally published in 1989 as Misk al-ghazal and was published in English in 1992. The English translator is Catherine Cobham. Publishers Weekly chose Women of Sand and Myrrh as one of the 50 best books of 1992.

The storyline consists of four main characters: Suha, Tamr, Nur, and Suzanne.  Different sections of the novel give the perspectives of the four women, making the book a story with four different narrators.

The story is based in a relatively modern society in the Middle East.  Rather than having strong ties into the pre-20th century Middle East, it is representative of life in some of the more fundamentalist societies within the last few decades.  Elements of the book are present in this society today:

 Women wearing abayas and using different infrastructure elements.
 Mandatory prayers at certain times of the day
 Patriarchal society; many view women as good for little except raising children.
 Implementation of desalinization plants (a large clue that the main setting is Saudi Arabia), airports, etc.

The novel addresses many issues in today's society and has a wide variety of themes.  Main themes of the novel include differing gender roles, class distinctions, culture, religion, and materialism vs. romanticism.  Themes include:

 Men vs. women
 Feminism
 Use and/or abuse of power in a relationship
 Class distinctions
 Structure of society
 Rebellion against the status quo
 Culture and religion
 Freedom vs. Confinement/Restraint
 Elements of traditional culture and their effect
 Materialism vs. Romanticism
 The sexual disadvantages and existing desires of Arab women
 Hidden Lesbianism in Arab cultures
 The Innate desire of Arab women to be treated better

Women of Sand and Myrrh was banned in many Arabic lands for strong content (sexual, political, etc.) and for a strong treatment of Arabic culture.

1989 novels
Lebanese novels
Novels set in Saudi Arabia
Novels by Hanan al-Shaykh